O'Neill is a city in Holt County, Nebraska, United States. The population was 3,705 at the 2010 census. It is the county seat of Holt County.

History
O'Neill was platted in 1874. It was named for one of its founders, John O'Neill. O'Neill was originally settled largely by Irish immigrants. 

The town was incorporated in 1882.

Geography
O'Neill is located at  (42.460753, -98.647016).

O'Neill is the official Irish capital of Nebraska. Cattle, potatoes, tomatoes, soybeans and corn are the major products produced near this town.

Climate

Demographics

2010 census
At the 2010 census there were 3,705 people in 1,593 households, including 970 families, in the city. The racial makup of the city was 94.2% White, 0.2% African American, 0.5% Native American, 0.2% Asian, 0.2% Pacific Islander, 3.9% from other races, and 0.8% from two or more races. Hispanic or Latino of any race were 6.5%.

Of the 1,593 households 28.4% had children under the age of 18 living with them, 49.1% were married couples living together, 8.6% had a female householder with no husband present, 3.2% had a male householder with no wife present, and 39.1% were non-families. 34.6% of households were one person and 17.3% were one person aged 65 or older. The average household size was 2.28 and the average family size was 2.94.

The median age was 42.8 years. 24.8% of residents were under the age of 18; 6.5% were between the ages of 18 and 24; 20.9% were from 25 to 44; 27.5% were from 45 to 64; and 20.2% were 65 or older. The gender makeup of the city was 48.4% male and 51.6% female.

2000 census
At the 2000 census, there were 3,733 people in 1,554 households, including 988 families, in the city. The population density was 1,580.7 people per square mile (610.7/km). There were 1,740 housing units at an average density of 736.8 per square mile (284.7/km). The racial makup of the city was 98.53% White, 0.03% African American, 0.43% Native American, 0.16% Asian, 0.40% from other races, and 0.46% from two or more races. Hispanic or Latino of any race were 1.18% of the population.

Of the 1,554 households 30.4% had children under the age of 18 living with them, 54.0% were married couples living together, 7.7% had a female householder with no husband present, and 36.4% were non-families. 33.8% of households were one person and 17.8% were one person aged 65 or older. The average household size was 2.33 and the average family size was 3.01.

The age distribution was 26.7% under the age of 18, 5.7% from 18 to 24, 24.8% from 25 to 44, 20.4% from 45 to 64, and 22.3% 65 or older. The median age was 40 years. For every 100 females, there were 84.1 males. For every 100 females age 18 and over, there were 80.9 males.

The median household income was $30,815 and the median family income  was $40,063. Males had a median income of $28,614 versus $18,627 for females. The per capita income for the city was $15,998. About 5.0% of families and 8.5% of the population were below the poverty line, including 3.4% of those under age 18 and 12.3% of those age 65 or over.

Arts and culture

Annual cultural events
Saint Patrick's Day and the Summerfest in July are the town's main celebrations.

Museums and other points of interest
O'Neill houses the world's largest permanent shamrock. Made of colored concrete, it was installed in the main intersection of 4th & Douglas in 2000. Due to high traffic, each year the town repaints the shamrock for St. Patrick's Day as part of the town’s celebration.

Education
O'Neill has three high schools: St. Mary's Catholic School, O'Neill Public Jr/Sr. High School, and Word of Life Christian School.

Media
The Holt County Independent is O'Neill's local newspaper.

The local radio station is KBRX, 102.9FM, 1350AM. The FM band plays country music along with all the local news from the surrounding towns, while the AM band plays classic rock with a polka ("milking music") hour in the morning.

Infrastructure

Transportation
Until 1992, O'Neill was served by the Chicago and North Western Transportation Company. The line, known as the "Cowboy Line", ran from Norfolk, Nebraska to Chadron. The line has since been removed and "railbanked"; it is now part of the Cowboy Trail, the longest bike trail in Nebraska.

O'Neill is also served by a former Chicago, Burlington & Quincy branch line from the Sioux City, Iowa vicinity.  This line is now operated as the Nebraska Northeastern Railway.

The highways which go through O'Neill include U.S. Highway 20, U.S. Highway 275, and U.S. Highway 281.

Notable people

 Clayton Danks (1879-1970), three-time Cheyenne Frontier Days rodeo winner, model of Wyoming cowboy symbol; born in O'Neill in 1879
 Helen Duhamel (1904–1991), Rapid City, South Dakota, businesswoman and broadcaster, attended St. Mary's Catholic School in O'Neill
 Father Edward Flanagan, who established Boys Town, first served as a Catholic priest at St. Patrick's Catholic Church in O'Neill 
 Mike Johanns, U.S. Senator, started career as attorney in O'Neill 
 Thomas Kearns, U.S. Senator, Utah mining, banking and railroad magnate, owner of Salt Lake Tribune, an O'Neill native
 Moses Kinkaid, resident, Republican U.S. Representative from Nebraska and sponsor of Kinkaid Act, expanding the amount of land to be granted for homesteading plots
 Debra Kolste, Wisconsin State Assembly member since 2013, was born in O'Neill
 Frank Leahy, football coach at Notre Dame, member of College Football Hall of Fame, was born in O'Neill
 John O'Neill, Irish-born officer in American Civil War, member of Fenian Brotherhood; led Fenian raids on Canada in 1866 and 1871
 Harry Owens, bandleader and Academy Award-winning songwriter, was born in O'Neill
 Jake Peetz, offensive assistant coach of NFL's Los Angeles Rams, is a native of O'Neill

References

External links
 
 City of O'Neill
 O'Neill Area Chamber of Commerce
 City-Data.com
 ePodunk: Profile for O'Neill Nebraska
 St. Mary's Catholic School
 O'Neill Public Schools

Cities in Nebraska
Cities in Holt County, Nebraska
Irish-American neighborhoods
Irish-American culture in Nebraska
County seats in Nebraska
Populated places established in 1882
1882 establishments in Nebraska